Eoin Reddan (born Limerick, Ireland, 20 November 1980) is an Irish rugby union player who plays at scrum half.  He initially attended the Jesuit boarding school, Clongowes Wood, before moving school to Crescent College Comprehensive where he captained the school side. On leaving school he studied at the University of Limerick.

Club/Provincial Career

Reddan began playing rugby at 13 years of age with Old Crescent.  He earned caps for Munster at both schools and U19 levels. He played in the AIB League with both Old Crescent and Young Munster before signing for Connacht in 2001. He returned to Munster to sign a full-time contract in 2003 and debuted against Leinster in the Celtic League in September of that year making 27 league appearances over two seasons.  Former Ireland and Connacht coach Warren Gatland signed Reddan to join  London Wasps in 2005, where he succeeded Matt Dawson to become first choice scrum half, winning both a Heineken Cup in 2007 (scoring a try in the final) and the 2008 Guinness Premiership with them as well as captaining the side during the absence of Lawrence Dallaglio in 2007/08.

He joined Leinster in the summer of 2009 on a three-year contract. Reddan made his 100th appearance for Leinster during their Pro12 Grand Final play off game against Ulster on 17 May 2014.

International career
First capped at Schools level, Reddan represented Ireland at U19 and Student levels, making his senior international debut in the 2006 Six Nations as a replacement against France at the Stade de France. His first start came against Argentina during the summer tour that year.  He displaced Peter Stringer during the 2007 Rugby World Cup in the Irish team after  Irelands disastrous start to the campaign, playing in their two final group games, losses against Argentina and France. He made his  first Six Nations start for Ireland in their 16–11 victory over Italy at Croke Park in 2008 earning man of the match for his performance. He was then replaced by Tomás O'Leary as first choice Ireland scrum half. He was named in the Irish squad for the 2009 summer tour to America.

By the Rugby World Cup 2011 game against Australia, Reddan had replaced O'Leary as the first choice scrum half in the Ireland XV. He scored his second try for Ireland against Scotland on 10 March 2012.

Reddan appeared in three 2013 Six Nations matches as a replacement but broke his leg in a 13-13 draw with France that ruled him out for three months.

Personal life
Reddan married his long term girlfriend; Aoife O'Gorman on Friday 10 July 2009. The reception was held at The Lodge at Doonbeg, Co Clare, Ireland

References

External links
Munster profile
Leinster profile
Ireland profile
Scrum.com

1980 births
Living people
Rugby union scrum-halves
Irish rugby union players
Ireland international rugby union players
Leinster Rugby players
Munster Rugby players
Connacht Rugby players
Wasps RFC players
People educated at Crescent College
Rugby union players from Limerick (city)
Irish expatriate sportspeople in England
Irish expatriate rugby union players
Expatriate rugby union players in England
Alumni of the University of Limerick